Male language is the name of two unrelated languages:

 Male language (Ethiopia), an Omotic language spoken in southern Ethiopia
 Male language (Papua New Guinea), a Madang language
 Malê language, also known as Hote
 Malé dialect of Maldivian